Madres egoístas (Selfish mothers) is an Argentine-Mexican telenovela, produced by Juan Osorio for Telefe and Televisa in 1991.

Enrique Novi, Julieta Rosen, Chantal Andere, and Orlando Carrió starred as the protagonists, while Alberto Mayagoitia and María del Sol starred as the main antagonists.

Plot 
Raquel Rivas Cantú, a young orphan and heir to a great fortune, is raised by her housekeeper, Mariana. Mariana is resentful of Raquel because she believes the Rivas Cantú family stole the life she deserved. Raquel eventually marries an honest widower named Pablo. Pablo has a daughter, Carmen, who is studying at a private boarding school.

Raquel and Pablo have another daughter, Gaby. Pablo begins to suspect that Mariana is not the person she appears to be, so he puts Gaby in the care of a nanny on the condition that Mariana never gets close to her.

After four years of immense happiness, one day Mariana sits Gaby down to play in the middle of the street. While driving home, Pablo almost runs over Gaby but manages to see her in time to avoid her. Gaby is not harmed but the shock causes Pablo to have a fatal heart attack, leaving Raquel and Gaby alone. Raquel takes Mariana's advice, given in bad faith, to enroll Gaby in a private boarding school. At this school, Gaby meets Carmen and the two grow up together without knowing they are half-sisters.

Mariana and her son, Felipe, make the life of the Rivas Cantús a nightmare. However, several characters show up later and provide an unexpected turn to this story of love, revenge, and betrayal.

Cast 

Julieta Rosen as Raquel Rivas Cantú
Enrique Novi as Pablo Ledesma
Orlando Carrió as Víctor Peralta
Chantal Andere as Carmen Ledesma Arriaga
María del Sol as Mariana González/Magdalena González/Catalina/Dolores
Alberto Mayagoitia as Fernando González/Felipe Godoy/Fernando Rivas-Cantú González
Toño Mauri as Maximiliano "Max" Báez
Laura Sotelo as Ivonne/Dora Silvana
Lilian Macías as Gabriela "Gaby" Ledesma Rivas-Cantú
Oscar Servin as Refugio "Cuca"
Manolita Saval as Rosario Urióstegui
Roberto Cañedo as Joaquín Urióstegui
Tere Valadez as Ofelia
Rafael Amador as Gerardo
Anahí as Gabriela "Gaby" Cantú (child)
Dina de Marco as Jacinta Arriaga
Justo Martínez as Severo Arriaga
Roberto Sosa as Salvador "Chava" Godinez
Maty Huitrón as Mina Báez
Claudio Obregón as Alberto Báez
Gerardo Acuña as Raymundo Cooper
Diana Golden as Ana Cervantes
Fernando Colunga as Jorge
Laura Martí as Sara Báez
Tere Mondragón as Rufina Noriega
Norma De Anda as Inés
Maricruz Nájera as Natalia Blinder
Rafael del Villar as Héctor Cruz
Gustavo Navarro as Hugo Peralta
Lucía Hernández as Iris
Héctor Cruz Lara as Horacio
Jalil Succar as Antonio
Antonio Miguel as Lucio
Alicia Osorio as Maestra Lilia Rangel
Grecia as Maestra Alarcón
Gabriela Michell as Maestra Piedad
Irina Areu as Ms. Ferriz
Renata de los Ríos as Aurora
Denisse Castillo as Cata
Alexandra Pérez as Flora
Chantal Guedy as Ema
Ondina as Celeste
Roberto Garza Leal as Alfredo
Yuliana Peniche as Carmen (child)
Jair de Rubín as Hugo (child)
Carlos Fuentes as Maximiliano (child)
Salvador González as Chava (child)
Paola Rojas as Carmen (newborn)
Leonor Llausás as Josefa
Leonor Bonilla as Avelina
Miguel Gutiérrez as Olegario
Scarlet Maceira as Rosenda
Guillermo Larrea as Memo'
Guillermo Rivas as Bonifacio "Boni" Salgado
Tony Marcín as Rosaura
Jeannette Candiani as Maribel
David Montenegro as Salvador Martín del Campo
Alejandro del Castillo as Teniente Hernández
John Pike as Gómez Williams
Nubel Espino as Dr. Albores
Mario Iván Martínez as Iván Escandón
Philippe Amand as Pierre
Roque Casanova as Polignac
Lizbeth Ramirez as Rosaly
Bruno Schwebel as Mr. Duvall
Tara Parra as Sol Deschamps
Carlos Espinoza as Dr. Pizano
Roberto Estrada as Lic. Torres
Lilian Davis as Alicia
Mario Erosa as Bank manager
Laura Zaizar as Mrs. Landis
Rosalba Castellanos as Paca
Helio Castillo as Gaby's Teacher 
Carl Hillos as Manuel
José Olivares as Pancho
Marisol Cazzaro as Joaquina
Ángel Heredia as Doctor of Red Cross
Arnoldo Picasso as Carlos
Walter Medina as Raúl
Anabel Pompa as Lilia
Mauricio Bonet as Pollo
Beatriz Zazueta as Estela
Roberto Ruy as Lic. Mendoza
Sagrario Baena as Amalia de Ramírez
Miguel Gómez Checa as Álvarez
Diana Torres as Adriana Nava
Fernando Pinkus as Sergio
Grace Nenna as Niebla
Enrique Hidalgo as Dr. Schultz
Judith Velasco Herrera as Lic. Pilar Zaldain
Cynthia Zurita as Blanca
Dora Luz Alcalá as Herlinda
Alejandro Villeli as Dr. Martínez
Tere Suárez as Mrs. Monasterios
Astrid Margarita as Lidia
Galia Larrea as Nurse
Patricia Hernández as Nurse
Guillermo Puente as Counselor
Licia Suárez as Elena
Federico Valdés as Auditor
Miguel Serros as Agent #1
Rubén Herrera as Agente #2

Awards

References

External links

1991 telenovelas
Mexican telenovelas
1991 Mexican television series debuts
1991 Mexican television series endings
Spanish-language telenovelas
Television shows set in Mexico
Televisa telenovelas